This is a list of offshore wind farms within the national maritime boundaries of the United Kingdom. The name of the wind farm is the name used by the energy company when referring to the farm; it is usually related to the name of the nearest town on shore.

In October 2022 the (nameplate) capacity of offshore wind farms in operation was approximately 13GW, with a further 4GW under construction.  Contracts to subsidize a further 10GW (one wind farm is only partially contracted) have been awarded by the UK Government.

If all the proposed wind farms are developed, then in the 2030s the United Kingdom would have a (nameplate) capacity of 73GW.



Operational offshore wind farms
In October 2022, there were offshore wind farms consisting of 2,595 turbines with a combined capacity of 13,628 Megawatts.  Strike price based on £/MWh at 2012 prices.

Map of the UK offshore wind farms

Wind farms under construction 
Offshore wind farms currently under construction, with a combined capacity in October 2022 of 4,160 MW.  Strike price based on £/MWh at 2012 prices.

Pre-construction wind farms 
Wind farms that have started onshore construction and have been awarded contracts under the UK Government's Contracts for Difference Round 3 (2019)/Round 4 (2022).  Total capacity of 3,825 MW.  Strike price based on £/MWh at 2012 prices.

Proposed wind farms - Contracts for Difference Round 3 
This wind farm has been proposed under the UK Government's Contracts for Difference Round 3 (2019), with a capacity of 12 MW.  Strike price based on £/MWh at 2012 prices.

Proposed wind farms - Contracts for Difference Round 4 
Wind farms proposed under the Round 4 (2022) CFD auction, with a combined capacity of 6,242 MW .  Strike price based on £/MWh at 2012 prices.

Proposed wind farms - early planning 
Wind farms that are in an exploratory phase and have not yet secured a Contract for Difference at auction.

Total capacities: England: 15,823 MW - Wales: 700 MW - Scotland: 30,326 MW

Decommissioned offshore wind farms
In October 2022, there was one offshore wind farm that had been decommissioned, consisting of 2 turbines with a combined capacity of 4MW.

See also 

List of onshore wind farms in the United Kingdom
Renewable energy in the United Kingdom
Wind power in the United Kingdom
List of offshore wind farms
Lists of offshore wind farms by country
Lists of offshore wind farms in the North Sea
Lists of offshore wind farms in the Irish Sea

Notes

External links 
 4C Offshore's Global Offshore Wind Farm Map and Database
 List of United Kingdom Wind Farms, thewindpower.net

Wind farms 

United Kingdom
Wind